Patrick Rafter defeated Greg Rusedski in the final, 6–3, 6–2, 4–6, 7–5 to win the men's singles tennis title at the 1997 US Open. It was his maiden major title. Rafter became the first Australian to win the title since John Newcombe in 1973. It was Rusedski's first major final, dedicated in honor of Diana, Princess of Wales, who had died a week earlier in Paris.

Pete Sampras was the two-time defending champion, but lost in the fourth round to Petr Korda.

Seeds

Qualifying

Draw

Finals

Top half

Section 1

Section 2

Section 3

Section 4

Bottom half

Section 5

Section 6

Section 7

Section 8

References

External links
 ATP – 1997 US Open Men's Singles draw
1997 US Open – Men's draws and results at the International Tennis Federation

Men's singlesMen's singles
US Open (tennis) by year – Men's singles